Saint-Célestin may refer to:

Saint-Célestin, Quebec (municipality), a municipality in the Centre-du-Québec region of Quebec
Saint-Célestin, Quebec (village), a village municipality enclaved within the municipality

See also
 Pope Celestine I, a saint
 Pope Celestine V, a saint